Olaitan Soyannwo is a Nigerian Professor of Anaesthesia and consultant at the University of Ibadan and foreign secretary of the Nigerian Academy of Science.
She was formerly the President of International Association for the Study of Pain.

References

Living people
Academic staff of the University of Ibadan
Nigerian anesthesiologists
Yoruba women academics
Nigerian women academics
Year of birth missing (living people)
Yoruba people
Women anesthesiologists
21st-century Nigerian medical doctors
21st-century women physicians
Nigerian women medical doctors